Nancy Mayer is an American politician who most recently served as the state Treasurer of Rhode Island from 1993 to 1998. She was the first Republican Treasurer of Rhode Island since Thomas P. Hazard in 1940 and the last Republican Treasurer of Rhode Island as of 2022. She has been credited with introducing and implementing a number of reforms, both in the Office of the General Treasurer and in the General Assembly. In 1996, she ran for U.S. Senate after incumbent Claiborne Pell decided to retire. She won the Republican primary. She lost the general election to Jack Reed.

References

|-

Living people
Rhode Island Republicans
State treasurers of Rhode Island
Women in Rhode Island politics
1937 births